Metatrichoniscoides leydigi is a species of woodlouse in the family Trichoniscidae that can be found in Belgium, Sweden, the Netherlands and the Britain I.

References

Woodlice
Crustaceans described in 1880
Woodlice of Europe